Sanoja is a surname which is common in Venezuela and the Dominican Republic.

People with the name
 Chucho Sanoja (1926–1998), Venezuelan musician
 Jesús Sanoja Hernández (1930–2007), Venezuelan journalist, historian, and writer
 Sonia Sanoja (1932–2017), Venezuelan dancer, teacher, choreographer, and poet

References